Chang Fu-chien (born Chang Chien-ling on 13 November 1949) is a Chinese actor based in Taiwan. He won Golden Bell Award for Best Actor in 1988 and 1993.

Filmography

Films

TV dramas

References

External links

1949 births
Male actors from Qingdao
20th-century Chinese male actors
21st-century Chinese male actors
20th-century Taiwanese male actors
21st-century Taiwanese male actors
Taiwanese male film actors
Taiwanese male television actors
Taiwanese male stage actors
Living people
Taiwanese people from Shandong
Chinese male film actors
Chinese male television actors